David Griffin (born 1967 in Kempsey, New South Wales) is an Australian swimmer. He lost his right leg above the knee in a tractor accident when he was 11 years of age. At the age of 15 he was noticed by a local swim coach Roger Whitmore and began training in earnest for the NSW Amputee championships.

David competed in the 1984 Games for the Disabled in New York where he won a bronze medal in the 100 m butterfly. At the 1988 Seoul Paralympics he won bronze medals in both the 100 m butterfly and freestyle events.

References

 

Living people
1967 births
Male Paralympic swimmers of Australia
Australian amputees
Paralympic bronze medalists for Australia
Medalists at the 1984 Summer Paralympics
Medalists at the 1988 Summer Paralympics
Swimmers at the 1984 Summer Paralympics
Swimmers at the 1988 Summer Paralympics
Paralympic medalists in swimming
Australian male butterfly swimmers
Australian male freestyle swimmers
People from the Mid North Coast
Sportsmen from New South Wales
20th-century Australian people